Raghuvaran Velayutham (11 December 1958 – 19 March 2008) was an Indian actor who predominantly acted in films made in South India. He has acted in more than 200 Tamil, Telugu, Malayalam, Kannada and Hindi films. According to the Hindustan Times, "The actor had carved a niche for himself with his special style and voice modulation."

He played the protagonist of a Tamil soap opera, Oru Manithanin Kathai, about a well-to-do man who becomes an alcoholic. He received critical acclaim for his role as Father Alphonso in the Malayalam movie Daivathinte Vikruthikal, directed by Lenin Rajendran and based on M. Mukundan's novel of the same name.

Raghuvaran's six-song music album, composed and sung by him, were officially released by actor Rajinikanth and the album was received by actress Rohini and Raghuvaran's son Rishi Varan.

Personal life

He was born as the eldest among four children in 1958 at Kollengode in Palakkad district in Kerala. He was the grandson of Mr. N. Radhakrishnan Nair and son of Chunkamannathu N. R. Velayudhan Nair and Kasthuri Chakkungal. When his father moved his hotel business from Mathur to Coimbatore, the family shifted to Coimbatore. He had his primary education from Stanes Anglo Indian Higher Secondary School, Coimbatore. He also learned piano from Trinity College London.

He discontinued his Bachelor of Arts in history from Coimbatore (Government Arts College) to pursue a career in acting. He landed a minor role in the Kannada film Swapna Thingalgal. He began acting in minor roles in Telugu and Kannada films.

From 1979 to 1983, he was part of an acting drama troupe in Chennai, Chennai Kings, which also included the Tamil actor, Nassar. He was spotted and cast as the lead actor in Ezhavathu Manithan, which was his biggest role to date.

He married Rohini in 1996 and their son Rishi Varan was born in 2000. The couple later separated and divorced in 2004.

Career

Following his beginnings on the stage, and a diploma in acting from M.G.R. Government Film and Television Training Institute in Chennai, Raghuvaran approached many Kollywood studios aiming for performance oriented roles and finally got selected as hero. The offbeat film named Ezhavathu Manithan (Seventh Man), directed by Hariharan won many awards, but not many offers for him. A few more films followed with him as hero, like Oru Odai Nadhiyagirathu and Nee Thodumbothu released, but did not become successes. The villain role in Silk Silk Silk was noticed and the film's success opened the gate of offers for him. The villain act continued in films like Kutravaaligal, Mr. Bharath, Poovizhi Vasalile, Manthira Punnagai and Oorkavalan. He appeared as hero as well as supporting actor in between releases as well. The major ones are Mudivalla Arambam and Samsaram Adhu Minsaram.

In a leading role

In the mid 1980s, Raghuvaran did many films as hero and most of them did good business as well. The films Michael Raj, Megam Karuththirukku, Koottu Puzhukkal and Kavithai Paada Neramillai helped to stabilize his career. The lawyer in Kaliyugam, the police officer in Thaimel Aanai, the rowdy with a golden heart in Kai Naattu, the honest Medical student turned Goonda in Kuttravali and the common man in En Vazhi Thani Vazhi helped Raghuvaran's market value as hero to reach greater heights. But his desire to try all types of roles, like supporting actor as well as villain simultaneously halted the progress as hero, even though he played hero roles in Vyooham, Kavacham and Anjali later. His supporting roles in Annanagar Mudhal Theru and Siva were well received too.

Experimentation

Raghuvaran was pitted against Dilip Kumar in his Bollywood debut Izzatdaar and his popularity further soared at the national level with Ram Gopal Varma's gangster flick Shiva, where he played the dreaded gangster Bhawani. Other Bollywood films include  Rakshak opposite Sunil Shetty (1996), Lal Baadshah opposite Amitabh Bachchan (1999), Hitler opposite Mithun Chakraborty (1998) and Grahan along with Jackie Shroff, where he replaced a busy Nana Patekar in 2001.

In a career span lasting for more than 26 years, Raghuvaran performed each role with his trademark mannerisms, often stealing the thunder from more established stars and even heroes. His magnetic baritone voice was an advantage and he modulated it to suit his variety of roles. He also set his own style of mannerisms and brought a distinct dialogue delivery and even changed his gait in many films. All this dedication won him more fans and helped  his popularity soar ever higher.

He has received several state and Filmfare Awards for his performances in Tamil, Malayalam and Telugu films. He began his career as a supporting actor in a number of films in Tamil including Mani Rathnam's Anjali as the father of an autistic child. He later played villains in Baasha as Mark Anthony, Mudhalvan as Aranganathan (corrupt Chief Minister of Tamil Nadu), Shiva and Muthu as Ilaimaran. He later returned to supporting roles – sometimes as a father or as a mentor in films such as Alai, Yaaradi Nee Mohini, Thirumalai and Bala.

Death
Raghuvaran died on 19 March 2008. The cause of death was due to organ failure because of excessive alcohol consumption. His death occurred during the filming stages of several films, including  Kanthaswamy (2009),wherein Raghuvaran's portions were reshot with Ashish Vidyarthi, which resulted in the film's delayed release. His posthumous film, Aatadista, released shortly after his death.

Filmography

1980s

1990s

2000s

Singer

Awards
Winner, Tamil Nadu State Film Award for Best Villain for Mudhalvan (1999)

References

External links
 

1958 births
2008 deaths
Male actors from Kerala
Male actors in Kannada cinema
Indian male film actors
Male actors in Malayalam cinema
Male actors in Tamil cinema
M.G.R. Government Film and Television Training Institute alumni
People from Palakkad district
Alumni of Trinity College of Music
Male actors in Telugu cinema
21st-century Indian male actors
20th-century Indian male actors
Male actors in Hindi cinema